"Bullet in the Gun" is a song by British music act Planet Perfecto. It was originally released in 1999 with remixes from Trouser Enthusiasts, then it was re-issued in 2000 with new remixes from Rob Searle, Rabbit in the Moon, and Solarstone.

Charts

References

External links
 "Bullet in the Gun" on Discogs

1999 singles
Perfecto Records singles
Planet Perfecto songs
1999 songs
UK Independent Singles Chart number-one singles